Events in the year 2007 in Turkey.

Incumbents
President: Ahmet Necdet Sezer (until 28 August), Abdullah Gül (starting 28 August)
Prime Minister: Recep Tayyip Erdoğan

Deaths

January 
 January 15 - Lale Oraloglu, actress and screenwriter (b. 1924)
 January 19 - Hrant Dink, intellectual, journalist and columnist (b. 1954)
 January 24 - İsmail Cem, politician, intellectual and journalist (b. 1940)

February 
 February 20 - Zahrad, poet (b. 1924)

March 
 March 3 - Türkan Rado, professor of law (b. 1915)
 March 6 - Naci Özkaya, footballer (b. 1922)

April 
 April 18 - Ali Dinçer, engineer and politician (b. 1945)
 April 26 - Ümit Haluk Bayülken, diplomat, ambassador and politician (b. 1921)

May 
 May 6 - Nükhet Ruacan, singer (b. 1951)
 May 26 - Hasan Eren, Turkologist and Hungarologist (b. 1919)

June 
 June 23 - Erdal Saygın, academician (b. 1931)
 June 28 - Zehra Bilir, folk singer (b. 1913)

July 
 July 4 - Barış Akarsu, rock musician (b. 1979)
 July 11 - Ferhunde Erkin, pianist (b. 1909)
 July 12 - Ulus Baker, sociologist (b. 1960)

August

September 
 September 29 – Yıldırım Aktuna, psychiatrist and politician (b. 1930)

October 
 October 2 – İclal Ar, soprano (b. 1904)
 October 31 – Erdal İnönü, physicist and politician (b. 1926)

November 
 November 30
 Aydın Gün, opera singer and stage director (b. 1917)
 Engin Arık, physicist (b. 1948)

December 
 December 5 – Tankut Öktem, sculptor (b. 1941)
 December 10 – Vitali Hakko businessman (b. 1913)
 December 12 – Saadet İkesus Altan opera singer (b. 1916)
 December 20 – Savaş Dinçel actor (b. 1942)

References

 
Years of the 21st century in Turkey
2000s in Turkey
Turkey
Turkey
Turkey